Cedar Grove is an unincorporated community in Walker County, in the U.S. state of Georgia.

History
The community was descriptively named for a grove of cedar trees near the original town site. A post office called Cedar Grove was established in 1855, and remained in operation until it was discontinued in 1954.

References

Unincorporated communities in Walker County, Georgia
Unincorporated communities in Georgia (U.S. state)